U2AF homology motif (UHM) kinase 1, also known as UHMK1, is a protein which in humans is encoded by the UHMK1 gene.

Function

UHMK1 is a kinase enzyme which phosphorylates the protein stathmin and has an RNA recognition motif of unknown function.

Clinical significance

UHMK1 is highly expressed in the brain and has been genetically implicated in schizophrenia in two genetic studies.   Mice with the gene encoding stathmin knocked out, so that they do not express this protein in the brain, show abnormal fear responses. This effect could be developed as an animal model for schizophrenia.  UHMK1 also phosphorylates the CNS proteins myelin basic protein (MBP) and synapsin I so that genetic abnormalities in UHMK1 could contribute to the genetic cause of schizophrenia through several different brain pathways. UHMK1 is also implicated in the progression of many cancers such as gastric, liver, colorectal, cervical and leukemia.

References

Further reading